Ośno may refer to the following places in Poland:
Ośno, Lower Silesian Voivodeship (south-west Poland)
Ośno Lubuskie, Lubusz Voivodeship (west Poland)
Ośno, Aleksandrów County in Kuyavian-Pomeranian Voivodeship (north-central Poland)
Ośno, Żnin County in Kuyavian-Pomeranian Voivodeship (north-central Poland)
Ośno, Pomeranian Voivodeship (north Poland)

See also